Philip Ronald Griggs (12 June 1918 – 30 June 1980) was an English professional footballer who played one match as an inside forward for  Southampton in the final season before the Second World War.

Football career
Griggs was born in Southampton and represented the town at football. He was a member of the Southampton Schoolboys' team which reached the national schoolboys' final in 1932 and he later played for the FA Amateur XI.

He joined Southampton as an amateur in June 1937 and turned professional in April 1939. His only first-team appearance came in the final match of the 1938–39 season, when manager Tom Parker made five changes for the match at Plymouth Argyle, which ended in a 2–0 defeat.

During the Second World War, Griggs lost a leg thus preventing his return to football.

References

External links
Career details on www.11v11.com

1918 births
1980 deaths
Footballers from Southampton
English footballers
Southampton F.C. players
English Football League players
Association football forwards
British military personnel of World War II
English amputees